The Rolls-Royce Goshawk was a development of the Rolls-Royce Kestrel that used evaporative or steam cooling. In line with Rolls-Royce convention of naming piston engines after birds of prey, it was named after the goshawk.

The engine first ran in 1933 and provided 660 horsepower (490 kW). Only a few engines were built as the aircraft designs intended to use it were not adopted by the Royal Air Force. The Goshawk was used to power the Short Knuckleduster, the Supermarine Type 224 (a predecessor to the Supermarine Spitfire) and other prototype aircraft.

Design and development
The Goshawk was developed from the Kestrel IV prototype engine, to use evaporative (also known as "steam") cooling. Rather than keep the cooling liquid below its boiling point in the cooling system, the coolant was allowed to boil; the phase change from liquid to vapour takes more heat from the engine, so less weight of coolant is needed. However, the radiator had to be bulkier to accommodate coolant in its gas phase, which increased drag.

Twenty engines were built, and flew only in prototypes as a few manufacturers' private ventures and "one-offs". Problems with coolant leaks, coolant pumping and the realisation that large wing-mounted condensing radiators would be vulnerable to combat damage caused the project to be cancelled, although valuable lessons had been learned and were put to good use with development of the later Merlin.

Variants
Goshawk I
(1932) Developed from the prototype Kestrel IV.
Goshawk II
(1935) 600 hp. Lowered propeller reduction gear ratio.
Goshawk III
(1935) 600hp. Further reduction of gear ratio.
Goshawk VI
660 hp. High ratio reduction gear.
Goshawk VII
660 hp. Raised reduction gear ratio.
Goshawk VIII
660 hp. Special experimental engine. Maximum power output: 837 hp.

Applications

The Goshawk was the power unit specified for the twin engined Short Knuckleduster flying boat (K3574) to Specification R24/31 and "preferred" for submissions to Air Ministry specification F7/30 for a fighter aircraft. Goshawks were used by all three officially sponsored prototypes, the Supermarine Type 224 (K2890),the Westland F.7/30 (K2891) and the Blackburn F3 (K2892), which only taxied with the Goshawk fitted and did not fly, in addition to two private venture entrants, the Bristol Type 123 and the Hawker P.V.3.

The Goshawk also powered Hawker's privately developed "High Speed Fury Mk 2" (K3586) and "Intermediate Fury"  2" (the latter Hawker's own development aircraft and "hack" serial G-ABSE) and the Westland Pterodactyl V (K2770) and was installed for trials in the Gloster TSR.38 (S1705), and the first Gloster Gnatsnapper prototype (N227).

Application list
Blackburn F3
Bristol Type 123
Gloster Gnatsnapper
Gloster TSR.38
Hawker Fury
Hawker P.V.3
Supermarine Type 224
Westland Pterodactyl V
Westland F.7/30 (sometimes called the Westland P.V.4)

Specifications (Goshawk I)

See also

References
Notes

Bibliography

 Gunston, Bill. World Encyclopedia of Aero Engines. Cambridge, England. Patrick Stephens Limited, 1989. 
 Lumsden, Alec. British Piston Engines and their Aircraft. Marlborough, Wiltshire: Airlife Publishing, 2003. .
"The Two Rs" Flight 1954 from archive at Flightglobal.com

Further reading
 Rubbra, A.A. Rolls-Royce Piston Aero Engines - a designer remembers: Historical Series no 16 :Rolls-Royce Heritage Trust, 1990. 

Goshawk
1930s aircraft piston engines